The 1998–99 FA Vase was the 25th season of the FA Vase, an annual football competition for teams in the lower reaches of the English football league system.

Tiverton Town won the competition, beating Bedlington Terriers in the final.

Calendar

First round qualifying

Notes:
 † = After Extra Time

Second round qualifying

Notes:
 † = After Extra Time

First round

Notes:
 † = After Extra Time

Second round

Notes:
 † = After Extra Time

Third round

Notes:
 † = After Extra Time

Fourth round

Notes:
 † = After Extra Time

Fifth round

Notes:
 † = After Extra Time

Quarter-finals

Notes:
 † = After Extra Time

Semi-finals

Tiverton Town won 5–1 on aggregate.

Bedlington Terriers won 5–0 on aggregate.

Final

References

The Official Football Association Non League Club Directory 2000  

FA Vase
FA Vase
FA Vase seasons